In the Midst of Bloodied Soil is the debut studio album by American technical death metal band With Passion.

Track listing

Credits
As Blood Runs Black
Samuel McLeod – vocals
Andrew Burt – guitars
Shaun Gier – guitars
Michael Nordeen – bass
Brandon Guadagnolo – keyboards
Jacob Peete – drums
Production
Produced by As Blood Runs Black and Zack Ohren
Engineered, mixed, and mastered by Zack Ohren at Castle Ultimate Studios
Artwork
Cover art and layout by Mario Garza

References

2005 debut albums
With Passion albums